МHK Spartak or JHC Spartak (Russian for Spartacus) is a junior ice hockey club from Moscow, Russia.

Founded in 2009, they compete in the Western Conference of the Junior Hockey League - the top tier of Russian junior hockey. The team's home arena is the Sokolniki Arena, and they are affiliated with the Kontinental Hockey League team HC Spartak Moscow.

References

External links
 Official website

2009 establishments in Russia
Ice hockey clubs established in 2009
Ice hockey teams in Russia
Junior Hockey League (Russia) teams